Pavičići may refer to:

 Pavičići, Bosnia and Herzegovina, a village near Sokolac
 Pavičići, Croatia, a village near Netretić